Bloody Hell is a comedy-drama film written and directed by Molly McGlynn, which premiered at South by Southwest on March 13, 2023. It stars Maddie Ziegler and Emily Hampshire.

The story centers around Lindy (Ziegler), a teenage girl diagnosed with Mayer-Rokitansky-Kuster-Hauser syndrome (MRKH), and her relationships with her single mother (Hampshire), new boyfriend (D'Pharaoh Woon-A-Tai) and other friends at her new high school. The movie was filmed in Sudbury, Ontario, Canada, concluding in June 2022.

Reception
On the review aggregator website Rotten Tomatoes, the film has an approval rating of 100% based on 5 reviews.

References

External links
Official website
 Bloody Hell at IMDB

2023 films